Brandon Green (born September 5, 1980) is a former American football defensive end. He was selected out of Rice University by the Jacksonville Jaguars as the 3rd pick of the 6th round of the 2003 NFL Draft.

Early years 
Green was a four-year starter at Industrial High School in Vanderbilt, Texas. As a senior, earned first-team Class 3A all-state, all-district, and All-county honors at tight end. Also made 43 tackles and forced three fumbles. Was a two-year captain and helped team to a 41–5 record in four years, capturing three district titles.

College career 
Green is Rice's career sack leader with 25.0. He finished Owls’ career with 209 tackles (138 solo), eight forced fumbles, two fumble recoveries, two interceptions, and four passes defensed in 44 games. Earned First-team All-WAC  as senior, starting every game and registered 71 tackles, 13 for losses, and eight sacks and also forced five fumbles and returned an interception 13-yards for a touchdown. As junior, earned First-team All-WAC honors, while starting every game. Won Joe Lipscomb Award as school's top true freshman player. Played in all 11 games.

Professional career

Jacksonville Jaguars
He was selected  by the Jacksonville Jaguars in the 6th round of the 2003 NFL Draft. In 2003 Green missed his rookie season with Jaguars after suffering patella fracture in practice (9/17). Was inactive for first two
weeks of season prior to injury. In 2004, he made NFL debut at Tennessee (9/26) tallying one solo tackle. Had one quarterback pressure versus Kansas City (10/24) re-aggravating patella injury and placed on injured reserve (10/26).

St. Louis Rams
In 2005, he was signed by the Rams and he made first career sack on Titans’ QB Steve McNair versus Tennessee (9/25), adding three tackles. Notched four tackles, one special teams tackle, and 1.0 sack versus Jacksonville (10/30). He ended the season with 32 tackles and 3 sacks and one forced fumble. In 2006, he played in 13 games making first start week 13 versus Arizonza. Green totaled 30 tackles with half of a sack, a pass defensed and one special teams tackle.

Seattle Seahawks
In 2007 Green was signed by the Seattle Seahawks as an unrestricted free agent.

References

External links
Brandon Green at ESPN.com

1980 births
American football defensive ends
Living people
Rice Owls football players
Jacksonville Jaguars players
St. Louis Rams players
Seattle Seahawks players
People from Victoria, Texas
People with type 1 diabetes